Aleksander Orłowski (9 March 1777 – 13 March 1832) was a Polish painter and sketch artist, and a pioneer of lithography in the Russian Empire.

Life

Orłowski was born in 1777 in Warsaw into an impoverished noble family, his father was a tavern-keeper. In early childhood he became known as a prodigy, and soon Izabela Czartoryska financed his first painting classes with the artist Jan Piotr Norblin. In 1793 Orłowski joined the Polish Army and fought in the Kościuszko Uprising against Imperial Russia and Prussia; he was wounded and returned to Warsaw for further studies, financed by Prince Józef Poniatowski. He studied with many notable painters of the age, including Norblin, Marcello Bacciarelli and Wincenty Lesserowicz.

In 1802, after the Partitions of Poland, he moved to Saint Petersburg, where he became a pioneer of lithography. He died there, aged fifty-five.

His works include countless sketches of everyday life in Poland and Russia, and scenes from the Kościuszko Uprising and other Polish wars.

Sources
 Bogusław Mucha, Artyści polscy w nowożytnej Rosji, Łódź 1994, 
 Ludwik Bazylow, Polacy w Petersburgu, Wrocław 1984, 
 "Aleksander Orłowski" from Tygodnik Ilustrowany #34 (19 May 1860) @ Polona

External links

 Biography, with paintings, drawings and graphic works by Orłowski @ Malarze

1777 births
1832 deaths
18th-century Polish–Lithuanian painters
18th-century male artists
19th-century Polish painters
19th-century Polish male artists
18th-century painters from the Russian Empire
Russian male painters
19th-century painters from the Russian Empire
Polish lithographers
Polish printmakers
Artists from the Russian Empire
Painters from the Russian Empire
Kościuszko insurgents
Artists from Warsaw
19th-century lithographers
Polish male painters